Robert Simpson Reid "Danny" Paton (27 January 1936 – 10 March 2011) was a Scottish footballer, who played for Heart of Midlothian ("Hearts"), Oxford United and Bedford Town.

Paton was born in the coal-mining village of Breich. He was a skilful, ball-playing inside-forward and featured in the Hearts side that won the 1962 Scottish League Cup Final.

References

External links

1936 births
2011 deaths
Footballers from West Lothian
Association football inside forwards
Scottish footballers
Heart of Midlothian F.C. players
Newtongrange Star F.C. players
Yeovil Town F.C. players
Oxford United F.C. players
Bedford Town F.C. players
Scottish Football League players
English Football League players
Cambridge City F.C. players
Washington Darts players
Atlanta Chiefs players
Scottish expatriate footballers
Expatriate soccer players in the United States
North American Soccer League (1968–1984) players
Scottish expatriate sportspeople in the United States
People from West Calder